The Croatian Tennis Association is the governing body of tennis in Croatia. It organizes Croatia's teams in the Davis Cup and the Fed Cup. It also organizes and helps coordinate local tournaments and produces a national ranking list of players.

The CTA was formed in 1990. However, the first tennis association in Croatia dates back to 1912. It is a member of the International Tennis Federation. The association's president is Franjo Luković.

Presidents
Hrvoje Šarinić
Stanko Bick
Jurica Malčić
Niko Bulić
Suad Rizvanbegović (–2000)
Slaven Letica (2000–2002)
Radimir Čačić (2002–2011)
Franjo Luković (2011–present)

External links
 

National members of Tennis Europe
Tennis in Croatia
Tennis
Sports organizations established in 1912
1912 establishments in Austria-Hungary